Batavia is an unincorporated community and census-designated place (CDP) in Boone County, Arkansas, United States. It was first listed as a CDP in the 2020 census with a population of 328.

Batavia was formerly an incorporated town. In 1880, Roswell Underwood established the first post office in the former town, which he named Batavia after his hometown of Batavia, New York. The town was laid out in blocks. The first house on Main Street was built in 1912. [Arkansas State Highway 392] is where Main Street was once located. The post office was closed in 1955. During its heyday, businesses included stores, hotels, a canning factory, a train depot, stockyards, mills, a corn gristmill, and a blacksmith shop. There was also a school and churches. By 1926, the passenger railroad stopped going through Batavia. While the community is larger in terms of population and homes than it was as an incorporated town, there are fewer businesses. Batavia township still exists (see township population history) without any current incorporated towns inside of it.

Demographics

2020 census

Note: the US Census treats Hispanic/Latino as an ethnic category. This table excludes Latinos from the racial categories and assigns them to a separate category. Hispanics/Latinos can be of any race.

References

Unincorporated communities in Boone County, Arkansas
Unincorporated communities in Arkansas
Census-designated places in Arkansas